Sir Gordon (Coligny) Whitteridge KCMG OBE (6 November 1908 – 11 January 1995) was a British diplomat. He was Ambassador to Burma from 1962 to 1965, and Ambassador to Afghanistan from 1965 to 1968.

References

Ambassadors of the United Kingdom to Myanmar
Ambassadors of the United Kingdom to Afghanistan
Knights Commander of the Order of St Michael and St George
Officers of the Order of the British Empire
1908 births
1995 deaths